G-15 is a name given to a group in Eritrea that opposes the policy of President Isaias Afewerki postponing elections and the failure in implementing the constitution. The membership of this group consists of former members of the President's ruling People's Front for Democracy and Justice (PFDJ) which has ruled the country since its independence in 1993. In May 2001 the group issued an open letter raising criticism against Isayas Afeworki's actions calling them "illegal and unconstitutional."

Detentions and exile
, of the 15 members of the group, 11 were imprisoned, three were living in the United States and one, Muhammad Berhan Belata, had left the group and rejoined the government. The 11 members who were imprisoned are thought to be charged with treason. The Central Office of the PFDJ believes that they share, "...a common guilt: at the minimum, abdication of responsibility during Eritrea's difficult hours, at the maximum, grave conspiracy." 

In 2010, a former prison guard claimed that six of the 11 prisoners had died: Ogbe from asthma in 2002, Mahmoud from a neck infection in 2003, and Astier, Germano, Hamid and Salih from "illness and heat exhaustion". Five remained alive but very ill; Haile Woldetensae had lost his sight.

Amnesty International named the imprisoned 11 prisoners of conscience and repeatedly called for their release.

Members
The list of the G-15 includes:
 Petros Solomon
 Mahmoud Ahmed Sherifo
 Haile Woldense
 Mesfin Hagos
 Ogbe Abraha
 Hamid Himid
 Saleh Idris Kekya
 Estifanos Seyoum
 Berhane Ghebrezgabiher
 Astier Fesehazion
 Mohammed Berhan Blata
 Germano Nati
 Beraki Gebreselassie
 Adhanom Ghebremariam
 Kidane Ghebreab Wed Keshi

References

External links
Amnesty International: Eritrea: Arbitrary detentions of government critics and journalists

 

Politics of Eritrea